KKAP (channel 36) is a religious television station in Little Rock, Arkansas, United States, part of the Daystar Television Network. The station is owned and operated by the Community Television Educators subsidiary of Daystar holding company Word of God Fellowship, Inc. KKAP's studios are located on Shackelford Drive in the Beverly Hills section of Little Rock, and its transmitter is located on Shinall Mountain, near the Chenal Valley neighborhood of Little Rock.

History

The station first signed on the air in May 2001.

Technical information

Subchannel

Analog-to-digital conversion
Because it was granted an original construction permit after the Federal Communications Commission (FCC) finalized the DTV allotment plan on April 21, 1997, the station did not receive a companion channel for its digital signal. KKAP shut down its analog signal, over UHF channel 36, on June 12, 2009, and "flash-cut" its digital signal into operation UHF channel 36.

References

External links 
 

Television channels and stations established in 2001
2001 establishments in Arkansas
KAP
Daystar (TV network) affiliates